Primus (Latin, 'first') is used as a name. It is also used after a name to designate the first born in a series of people with the same name, e.g. Alexander Monro (primus) (1697–1767).

People with the name include:

 Pope Primus of Alexandria, pope and patriarch of Alexandria 106–118
 Saint Primus (died c. 297), Christian martyr
 Barry Primus (birn 1938), American actor
 Brent Primus (born 1985), American mixed martial artist
 Greg Primus (born 1970), American footballer
 Guy Primus (born 1969), American entrepreneur and inventor
 Hubertus Primus (born 1955), German lawyer and journalist 
 James Primus (born 1964), American footballer
 Linvoy Primus (born 1973), English footballer
 Matthew Primus (born 1975), Australian rules footballer
 Nelson A. Primus (1842–1916), African-American artist
 Pearl Primus (1919–1994), American choreographer and dancer
 Richard Primus (born 1969), American law scholar
 Robert Primus (born 1990), Trinidadian footballer
 Robert E. Primus, American government official
 Roberto Primus (born 1949), Italian cross-country skier
 Roshon Primus (born 1995), Barbadian cricketer

See also

 Primus (disambiguation)
 Secundus (disambiguation)

Titles